The Equator was a nineteenth-century black issues newspaper edited by the pioneering African-American baseball players and civil rights activists Weldy Walker and his brother Moses Fleetwood Walker. No copies are known to have survived to the present day.

References 

Defunct African-American newspapers